Maniker Char is a union, the smallest administrative body of Bangladesh, located in Meghna Upazila, Comilla District, Bangladesh. The total population is 11,659.

References

Unions of Meghna Upazila